Isak Halvorsen (9 October 1877 - ??) was a Norwegian politician for the Liberal Party.

He served as a deputy representative to the Norwegian Parliament during the term 1928–1930, representing the Market towns of Møre og Romsdal county.

Born at Follestad, Skien, he got himself a job at the post office in Kristiansund in 1894. He was a member of Kristiansund city council from 1916 to 1931, and also chaired the local party chapter for some time. Meanwhile, he rose in the postal hierarchy to eventually become postmaster, in the city of Molde from 1936 to 1947. 

During the German occupation of Norway he was imprisoned for one day, being arrested on 7 October 1944 on suspicion of him having a false passport. He was released the next day.

References

1877 births
Year of death missing
Liberal Party (Norway) politicians
Deputy members of the Storting
Møre og Romsdal politicians
Politicians from Kristiansund